Despite the nation being torn apart by civil war, Iraqi football in 2007 went as scheduled for the most part. Iraqi clubs participated in international competition, the Olympic team went through qualifications, and the national team played in different tournaments. No games by the national team or the Iraqi clubs were played in Iraq due to violence.

National team

2007 Friendlies

2007 Gulf Cup

The Arabian Gulf Cup 2007, the 18th edition, took place in the United Arab Emirates, from 17 January 2007 to 30 January 2007. Iraq did not get beyond the group stage, and the tournament ended in accusations and allegations against the head coach of the national team.

Group stage

West Asian Football Federation Championship

The 2007 West Asian Football Federation Championship took part in the Jordanian capital Amman. The six entrants were Iraq, Iran, Syria, Palestine, Lebanon and host nation Jordan. The finals took place between 16th and 24 June 2007.

Group stage

Semi finals

Final

Asian Cup 2007

The Asian Football Confederation's 2007 AFC Asian Cup finals was held in July 2007 (Starting on July 7, 2007, ending on July 29, 2007). The competition was co-hosted by four nations – Indonesia, Malaysia, Thailand and Vietnam.  Iraq won the tournament.

Group stage

Quarter-finals

Semi-finals

Final

2010 World Cup Qualifiers

Kings's Cup

Arbil FC participated in the 2007 King's Cup as Iraq B team.

Round robin stage

Final

Olympic Team

2007 Olympic Friendlies

Olympic Games Qualification

The Iraqi Olympic team participated in the qualifications for the 2008 Summer Olympics. Iraq was seeded for the second round. The second round qualifications were held from February 28 to June 6, 2007. Iraq advanced to the final round qualifications, however the team failed to qualify for the Olympics after finishing second behind Australia.

Second round

Third (Final) Round

Youth Team

2007 Youth Team Friendlies

AFC Youth Championship Qualification

U-17 Team

West Asian Football Federation U-17 Championship 2007

AFC U-17 Championship Qualification

Domestic clubs in international tournaments

2007 AFC Champions League

The 2007 AFC Champions League was the 26th AFC Champions League, played between clubs from nations who are members of the Asian Football Confederation. The top 15 nations in the Asian Football Confederation were invited to nominate one or two clubs to participate in the 2007 competition; Iraq has 2 spots. The two spots were given to the Champion and the runner-up of the Iraqi Premier League, in the 2005-2006 year. Both clubs failed to qualify for the Quarter Finals.

Group A

Group C

2007–08 Arab Champions League

Iraq has 2 spots. The two spots were given to the 3rd Place and 4th Place of the Iraqi Premier League.

Round 32

Round 16

References

External links
iraq-football.net/